IMCA Modified is the top modified division sanctioned by the International Motor Contest Association. The series began in 1979. It was designed to be a mid-level class between late models and hobby stocks. The first IMCA modified race was held at the Benton County, Iowa Speedway in 1979 on a 1/4 mile track.

The car bodies are hybrids of open wheel cars and stock cars. The front tires have no body around them like an open wheel car, and the back wheels have a body around them like a stock car. The series has a $1,050 engine claim or $100 and exchange rule, and a one tire rule.

Sport modified
A sport modified division was created out of this division in the mid-2000s. This class features a similar chassis with lower horsepower, with the claim rule being $550. The division is divided into Northern and Southern Modified classes depending on the track's location in the United States. The Northern Modifieds feature restricted motors and chassis. The Southern Modifieds are purpose-built cars on 1978–87 General Motors G-Body chassis.

List of national modified  champions

2021 Jeff Larson 
2020 Tom Berry Jr.
2019 Jordan Grabouski
2018 Jordan Grabouski
2017 Jason Wolla
2016 Jordan Grabouski  
2015 Chris Abelson
2014 Zane DeVilbiss
2013 William Gould
2012 Keith White
2011 Jordan Grabouski
2010 Zane Devilbiss
2009 Dylan Smith
2008 P. J. Egbert
2007 Jared Siefert
2006 Benji LaCrosse
2005 David Murray Jr. 
2004 David Murray Jr.
2003 David Murray Jr.
2002 Jon Thompson
2001 David Murray Jr.
2000 Henry Witt Jr.
1999 Johnny Saathoff
1998 Johnny Saathoff
1997 Johnny Saathoff
1996 Johnny Saathoff
1995 Rick Stout
1994 Scott Pounds
1993 Ron Pope
1992 Danny Wallace
1991 Wayne Larson
1990 Bill Davis Sr.
1989 Bill Davis Sr.
1988 Dave Farren
1987 Shane Davis
1986 Dave Farren
1985 Rick Wages
1984 Mike Cothron
1983 Mike Schulte
1982 Dale Fischlein

Source:

List of IMCA Modified SuperNationals winners

2022: Tom Berry Jr.
2021: Cody Laney
2020: Ricky Thornton Jr.
2019: Ethan Dotson
2018: Jeff Aikey
2017: Richie Gustin
2016: Ricky Thornton Jr. 
2015: Kyle Strickler
2014: Kyle Strickler
2013: Dylan Smith
2012: Jeff Taylor
2011: Richie Gustin
2010: Jimmy Gustin
2009: Randy Havlik
2008: Kevin Stoa
2007: Todd Shute
2006: Rich Lewerke
2005: Benji LaCrosse 
2004: David Murray Jr.
2003: John Logue
2002: Darren Williams
2001: John Logue
2000: Kevin Stoa
1999: John Logue
1998: John Logue
1997: Mark Noble
1996: Kelly Boen
1995: John Logue
1994: Mark Noble
1993: Ron Pope
1992: Wayne Graybeal
1991: Tom Bartholomew
1990: Wayne Larson
1989: Kevin Pittman
1988: Mark Noble
1987: Wayne Larson
1986: Mike Frieden
1985: Mike Frieden
1984: Jack Mitchell
1983: Mike Schulte
reference:

References

External links
 IMCA.com

Open wheel racing
Stock car racing series in the United States